Eagle Rest Peak is a remote peak in the San Emigdio Mountains, located in southern Kern County, California,  west of the settlement of Grapevine and Interstate 5.

Wind Wolves Preserve
The mountain is in the Wind Wolves Preserve, owned by The Wildlands Conservancy.

References

External links
 "Wind Wolves Preserve", The Wildlands Conservancy website

San Emigdio Mountains
Mountains of Kern County, California
Mountains of Southern California